DISORT (Discrete Ordinates Radiative Transfer Program for a Multi-Layered Plane-Parallel Medium) - general and versatile plane-parallel radiative transfer program applicable to problems from the ultraviolet to the radar regions of the electromagnetic spectrum.  

DISORT is used in many atmospheric radiative transfer codes including Streamer, MODTRAN, RRTM and SBDART.

See also
List of atmospheric radiative transfer codes
Atmospheric radiative transfer codes
MODTRAN
Streamer: A Radiative Transfer Model
Rapid radiative transfer model

References
K. Stamnes, SC. Tsay, W. Wiscombe and K. Jayaweera, Numerically stable algorithm for discrete-ordinate-method radiative transfer in multiple scattering and emitting layered media, Appl Opt 27 (1988) (12), pp. 2502–2509.

Z. Lin, S. Stamnes., Z. Jin, I. Laszlo, SC. Tsay, W. Wiscombe, and K. Stamnes. Improved discrete ordinate solutions in the presence of an anisotropically reflecting lower boundary: Upgrades of the DISORT computational tool. Journal of Quantitative Spectroscopy and Radiative Transfer (2015) (157), pp. 119–134.

External links
LLLab DISORT Website, includes link to download * 

Second version of the "Radiative Transfer in the Atmosphere and Ocean" book website 
Atmospheric radiative transfer codes